Montréal Saint-Hubert Longueuil Airport , also called Montréal/Saint-Hubert Airport, is located in the Saint-Hubert borough of Longueuil, Quebec.

As of 2017, it is ranked as Canada's 15th busiest airport by aircraft movements. This airport mainly serves travellers to Quebec destinations.

The airport is classified as an airport of entry by Nav Canada and is staffed by the Canada Border Services Agency (CBSA) on a call-out basis from the Mirabel Airport. CBSA officers at this airport can handle general aviation aircraft only, with no more than 15 passengers.

History
In operation since 1928, it was Montreal's first and only airport until the construction of Montréal/Dorval International Airport (now Montréal–Pierre Elliott Trudeau International Airport). On 1 August 1930, the R100 airship arrived after what was possibly the first non-stop passenger-carrying powered flight across the North Atlantic to land in Canada.

In the late 1930s the airport was used by Canadian Associated Aircraft to build the Handley Page Hampden.

The airport was divided into two sides, a military side along with the Pratt & Whitney Canada facility (facing runway 06L/24R) and a civilian side (facing runway 06R/24L). Today the military base, the former RCAF Station St Hubert, has ceased operations, but the Armed Forces still use the base as a garrison comprising the tactical helicopter unit, 438 Squadron, 34 Service Battalion and 34 Canadian Brigade Group Headquarters. The ex-Pratt & Whitney hangar is owned and operated since 2012 as the largest FBO on the airport by an AvJet branded dealer: CYHU H-18 Services Inc. Their hangar is the newest addition to the FBO network : HUB FBO.

Following the new National Airports Policy announced by Transport Canada in 1994, ownership of the airport was transferred to a private corporation, Développement de l'aéroport Saint-Hubert de Longueuil (DASH-L), on 1 September 2004.

It was here that the body of Quebec Minister of Labour and Deputy Premier, Pierre Laporte, was found during the October Crisis of 1970.

It was announced on the 27 February 2023 that Porter Airlines will develop a new passenger terminal at the airport that is due to be completed in late 2024 and provide domestic flights throughout Canada.

Airlines and destinations

Passenger

Crashes 

 On March 17, 2017, about 13:00 EDT (17:00 UTC), a midair collision occurred on the southeastern side of the airport, over the city of Saint-Bruno-de-Montarville. One plane crashed on the rooftop of the shopping mall, injuring the pilot. The other crashed in the parking lot, killing the pilot. The owner of Cargair indicated that both pilots involved in the crash were from China.

See also 

 List of airports in the Montreal area
 CFB Montreal

References

Bibliography
 Jesse, William. "Breaking New Ground: The Canadian Government's First Civil Aerodrome". Air Enthusiast, No. 55, Autumn 1994, pp. 14–15.

External links
Official site (French & English)
Page about this airport on COPA's Places to Fly airport directory

Airports of the British Commonwealth Air Training Plan
Transport in Longueuil
Buildings and structures in Longueuil
Certified airports in Montérégie
1928 establishments in Quebec
Airports established in 1928